Norman Frederic Hallows (29 December 1886 – 16 October 1968) was an English middle-distance runner. Educated at Felsted School, he won the bronze medal and set an Olympic record in the 1500 metres race at the 1908 Summer Olympics in London. His time in the first round was 4:03.4, beating the Olympic record set by American Mel Sheppard only minutes earlier by 1.6 seconds. In the final, Sheppard matched Hallows' first round time while Hallows finished in third place at 4:04.0.

Hallows studied at Felsted School, Keble College in Oxford, Leeds University, and St Thomas' Hospital in London. He took part in the Balkan Wars of 1912–13 as a Red Cross staff and later in World War I, as a Captain of the Royal Army Medical Corps in France. In 1919 he was appointed as the resident Medical Officer at Marlborough College. Using the pen name "Duplex" he co-wrote several books on engineering.

References

Further reading

 
 
 

1886 births
1968 deaths
English male middle-distance runners
Olympic athletes of Great Britain
Athletes (track and field) at the 1908 Summer Olympics
Medalists at the 1908 Summer Olympics
Olympic bronze medallists for Great Britain
Olympic bronze medalists in athletics (track and field)
British Army personnel of World War I
Royal Army Medical Corps officers
Red Cross personnel
People of the Balkan Wars